Samuel Peck may refer to:

 Samuel Peck (daguerreotypist) (1813–1879), American photographer, artist, businessperson, photo case manufacturer, and gallery owner.
Samuel Minturn Peck (1854–1938), American poet
 Samuel Stanley Peck (1829–1901), Ontario lawyer, judge and political figure